El Mirage is a city in Maricopa County, Arizona, United States. As of the 2020 census, the population of the city was 35,805, up from 31,797 in 2010.

History
The Hohokam Native American tribe were the earliest inhabitants of the area that is now El Mirage. The ingenious Hohokam developed an elaborate irrigation network using only stone instruments and organized labor. They were commonly known as the "Canal Builders".

During the early 1930s, migrant farm workers settled in El Mirage on the west bank of the Agua Fria River. Mexican migrants came to El Mirage to help build the canals and harvest the first crops. Farming and agriculture remain central to El Mirage's economy, but it has witnessed a robust industry growth over the past few decades, emerging as a diverse urban community. 

The city became incorporated in 1951, and has continued to grow since.

Geography
El Mirage is located along the Agua Fria River and U.S. Route 60 within the northwestern part of the Phoenix metropolitan area. It is bordered to the east by Youngtown, to the south by Glendale, to the northwest by Surprise, and to the northeast by unincorporated Sun City.

Climate

Demographics

At the 2000 census, there were 7,609 people in 2,121 households, including 1,737 families, in the city. The racial makeup of the city was 66.3% White, 3.3% Black or African American, 0.9% Native American, 0.4% Asian, 0.1% Pacific Islander, 26.2% from other races, and 3.0% from two or more races. 66.8% of the population were Hispanic or Latino of any race.

Of the 2,121 households 48.8% had children under the age of 18 living with them, 55.3% were married couples living together, 17.7% had a female householder with no husband present, and 18.1% were non-families. 13.0% of households were one person and 3.7% were one person aged 65 or older. The average household size was 3.59 and the average family size was 3.87.

The age distribution was 36.8% under the age of 18, 14.1% from 18 to 24, 28.6% from 25 to 44, 13.8% from 45 to 64, and 6.6% 65 or older. The median age was 25 years. For every 100 females, there were 105.5 males. For every 100 females age 18 and over, there were 105.0 males.

The median household income was $33,813 and the median family income  was $33,468. Males had a median income of $25,176 versus $19,192 for females. The per capita income for the city was $10,342. About 12.6% of families and 15.9% of the population were below the poverty line, including 14.2% of those under age 18 and 22.0% of those age 65 or over.

El Mirage is near Luke U.S. Air Force Base, the largest Fighter Pilot Training Base in the North Atlantic Treaty Organization (NATO), and can boast that it has the highest paid city manager per capita in the Phoenix, Arizona metropolitan area

Historic structures of El Mirage

References

 Surprise Time Newspaper – City Managers Salary
 William M. Bercu, Ph.D., "El Mirage, Arizona", Salt River Stories, accessed February 24, 2022,

External links
 
 

Cities in Arizona
Cities in Maricopa County, Arizona
Phoenix metropolitan area